Madhya Pradesh Public Service Commission, publicly known as MPPSC is a state government-led agency of Madhya Pradesh state. It was constituted under the state and Union Public Service Commission Article-315, responsible for conducting civil services examinations and competitive examination. It makes direct recruitments to various civil services and departmental posts at state level.

History
The history of MPPSC begins with the former state commission Madhya Bharat Commission which was working from 1954-1956. Following the reorganization of Madhya Pradesh state, the new commission came into existence on 1 November 1956 under the Article 315 and Section 118 (3) of States Reorganisation Act, 1956

Functions 
The functions and duties of the commission are amended under the Forty-first Amendment of the Constitution of India, Article 335 and 376 which grants the commission permission to perform specific functions in the state.
To make direct recruitments of civil services in the state. 
To make promotions of the state-level officers in any department.
To make transfers in civil and departmental services from one department to another.

.

Commission profile
The Commission is headed by a Chairman, Secretary and other members for the specific roles.

See also

 List of Public service commissions in India

References 
"

External links
Official website 

Government of Madhya Pradesh
State agencies of Madhya Pradesh
State public service commissions of India
Government agencies established in 1956
1956 establishments in Madhya Pradesh